Habert is a surname. Notable people with the surname include:

 Germain Habert (1615–1654), French churchman and brother of Philippe Habert
 Henri Louis Habert de Montmor (1600–1679), French scholar and cousin of Germain and Philippe Habert
 Marie Dorin Habert (born 1986), French Olympic biathlete
 Philippe Habert (1605-1637), French poet and brother of Germain Habert
 Pierre-Joseph Habert (1773–1825), French general of the Napoleonic Wars